Red Balloon Learner Centres provide a safe, full-time learning environment for children aged eleven to sixteen (eighteen at Red Balloon of the Air) who have self-excluded from mainstream school due to bullying, trauma or mental health issues. 
The first Centre, in Cambridge, was set up in 1996 by founders Carrie Herbert and Ruth Loshak. There are now five physical Centres: Cambridge, Norwich, North-West London, Reading and Worthing. There is also a blended online and face-to-face provision called Red Balloon of the Air whose aim is to provide an online recovery programme for children who do not feel comfortable enough to attend a physical Centre. Each Centre is a registered charity, as is Red Balloon Educational Trust, which provides centralised support for all Centres.

General information
The main aims of the Red Balloon are to:
 Provide alternative secondary education up to Key Stage 4 to children who have been severely bullied, suffered trauma and/or suffer from poor mental health that prevents them attending mainstream school
 Provide individual, full-time academic, pastoral and therapeutic programmes tailored to each student
 Provide a safe, supportive, and welcoming environment 
 Encourage and model consideration and respect at all times
 Restore self-confidence
 Teach students how to respond to bullying
 Help students regain interest and engagement with their learning to reach their individual personal and educational goals.
 Help students return, as soon as possible, to mainstream education, progress to further education or find meaningful employment

The Centres provide a range of activities such as textiles, clay-work, painting, and African drumming, and the typical facilities include a science lab, a technology studio, a landscaped garden. There are only twenty students enrolled in a Centre at any given time, and most of the teaching is done on a one-to-one or small group basis.

Locations

Red Balloon Cambridge
Red Balloon has operated in Cambridge for over twenty-five years, and is now made up of two smaller Centres, which together have up to forty young people based in and around the Cambridgeshire area. They organise trips and visits throughout the year, ranging from short walks to local shops museums, to longer trips to London. Red Balloon Cambridge currently offers fourteen subjects.

Red Balloon Northwest London
Based in Harrow, Red Balloon Northwest London has up to twenty young people in the Northwest London area, and also has access to Harrow School’s sports facilities. It is assisted by Ben Bullen Adventures, so that the students can take part in the Duke of Edinburgh’s Award. Red Balloon Northwest London offers ten subjects but has the flexibility to cater to additional interests.

Red Balloon Norwich
Red Balloon Norwich is located in the centre of town and has to up to forty students in the old Victorian property, as well as access to trained therapists. Red Balloon Norwich offers 22 subjects, and all kinds of qualifications including GCSEs, ASDANs, and technical awards.

Red Balloon Reading
Situated across from Reading College, Red Balloon Reading has up to 24 students. In addition to art and music therapies, students have access to equine therapy at the local equestrian centre. With seven subjects on offer students have the opportunity to gain a range of GCSE qualifications and awards. As part of the wellbeing and social re-engagement strands of Red Balloon, students participate in sporting activities such as boxing, kayaking, and fencing in town, and are encouraged to join trips to museums, zoos and cultural sites.

Red Balloon Worthing
Red Balloon’s fifth physical centre opened in 2022 in Worthing, and has up to twenty students. The Centre is near good transport links which will help students partake in extracurricular activities and trips that get them engaging with their community again.

Red Balloon of the Air
Inspired by the 1950s Australian radio education programme ‘School of the Air’, Red Balloon of the Air uses technology to bring education to students who cannot access one of the physical Centres. Like all Red Balloon students, they have access to BACP-registered therapists. Red Balloon of the Air is available across the southeast of England and is open to people aged 11–18. Red Balloon of the Air also has a post 16 provision called the Step4ward Programme which supports students aged 16–20 with an Education and Health Care Plan (EHCP) to retake GCSE exams, access therapy, participate in the social re-engagement activities and/or catch up on any additional education they need to reach their goals.

Red Balloon Educational Trust 
In 2021 Red Balloon Learner Centre Group changed their name to Red Balloon Educational Trust (RBET). After consolidation in 2021, Red Balloon Educational Trust includes the operations of Red Balloon of the Air, the new Red Balloon Worthing, as well as providing Central Services.

References

External links
 Read Balloon Learner Centres website.

1996 establishments in England
Alternative schools in England
Charities based in England
Educational charities based in the United Kingdom
Educational institutions established in 1996
Private co-educational schools in London
Private schools in Cambridgeshire
Private schools in Norfolk
Private schools in the London Borough of Harrow
Private schools in Reading, Berkshire